The castra of Orheiu Bistriței was a fort in the Roman province of Dacia. It was built in the 2nd century AD. Archaeological research also identified the nearby vicus. The castra and the nearby settlement were both abandoned in the 3rd century AD. The ruins of the fort are located in Orheiu Bistriței (commune Cetate, Romania).

See also
List of castra

External links
Roman castra from Romania - Google Maps / Earth

Notes

Roman Dacia
Archaeological sites in Romania
Ancient history of Transylvania
Historic monuments in Bistrița-Năsăud County